Sonny Collins is an American former Negro league pitcher who played in the 1930s.

Collins played for the New York Black Yankees in 1933 and for the Bacharach Giants the following season. In six recorded career appearances on the mound, he posted an 8.89 ERA over 27.1 innings.

References

External links
 and Seamheads

Year of birth missing
Place of birth missing
Bacharach Giants players
New York Black Yankees players
Baseball pitchers